Diastellopalpus is a genus of Scarabaeidae or scarab beetles in the superfamily Scarabaeoidea.  It was considered a subgenus of Onthophagus by some authorities.

References

Scarabaeinae